Bindus can refer to:

 Deity in Illyrian religion, identified with Neptune
 Latvian variant of Benedict (given name). Feast day of St. Benedict used to be called Bindus diena in Latvian.